Stephen Charnock (1628–27 July 1680), Puritan divine, was an English Puritan Presbyterian clergyman born at the St Katherine Cree parish of London.

Life

Charnock studied at Emmanuel College, Cambridge, during which he was converted to the Christian faith, beginning his spiritual journey as a Puritan divine. After leaving the college, he possibly held a position as either a private teacher or tutor, then moving on to become a minister of the faith in Southwark for a short time, converting individuals to Christianity. He continued on to New College, Oxford, where he earned a fellowship and gained a position as senior proctor

He moved to Ireland in 1656 where he became a chaplain to Henry Cromwell, governor of Ireland. In Dublin, he began a regular ministry of preaching to other believers. Those who came to hear him were from different classes of society and differing denominations, and he became widely known for the skill by which he discharged his duties.

In 1660, the monarchy of England was restored after its brief time as the Commonwealth of England, and Charles II ascended the throne of England, Scotland, and Ireland. Due to new restrictions, Charnock was now legally prevented from practicing public ministry in Ireland, and in England where he returned. Nevertheless, he continued to study and to minister in non-public ways.

Charnock began a co-pastorship at Crosby Hall in London in 1675; this was his last official place of ministry before his death in 1680.

Works

Nearly all of the numerous writings attributed to him were transcribed after his death. Charnock's theological fame rests chiefly in his   Discourses upon the Existence and Attributes of God, a series of lectures delivered to the members of his congregation at Crosby Hall; unfortunately, however, the Discourses were cut short by Charnock's death in 1680. The treatise is preserved today as The Existence and Attributes of God, first published posthumously in 1682.

References

Further reading
Beeke, Joel R., and Randall J. Pederson. "Stephen Charnock (1628-1680)." In Meet the Puritans: With a Guide to Modern Reprints. Grand Rapids: Reformation Heritage Books, 2006.
_ and Mark Jones. "Stephen Charnock on the Attributes of God." In A Puritan Theology: Doctrine for Life. Grand Rapids: Reformation Heritage Books, 2012.
Deusterman, Ken. "Stephen Charnock's Doctrine of God: An Anthology of the Existence and Attributes of God." American Theological Inquiry 3, no. 1 (January 2010): 127–149.
Drayson, F. K. "Divine Sovereignty in the Thought of Stephen Charnock." In Puritan Papers, vol. 1. Edited by D. Martyn Lloyd-Jones and foreword by W. Robert Godfrey. Phillipsburg: P&R Publishing Company, 2000.
Gatis, George Joseph. "Stephen Charnock's View of Substantive Biblical Law." Contra Mundum, no.13 (Fall 1994): 1–14.
Park, Jae-Eun. "Stephen Charnock’s Christological Knowledge of God in A Discourse of the Knowledge of God in Christ." The Confessional Presbyterian, 10 (2014): 73–81.
Trueman, R. Carl. "Reason and Rhetoric: Stephen Charnock on the Existence of God." In Reason, Faith and History Philosophical Essays for Paul Helm. Farnham: Ashgate Publishing, 2008.
Yuille, J. Stephen. "How Pastoral Is Open Theism?: A Critique from the Writings of George Swinnock and Stephen Charnock." Themelios 32, no. 2 (January 2007): 46–61.

External links
Writings of Stephen Charnock
Life and Character of Stephen Charnock
Sermons by Stephen Charnock and others
Stephen Charnock Project

1628 births
1680 deaths
English Presbyterian ministers
Ejected English ministers of 1662
Alumni of Emmanuel College, Cambridge
Alumni of New College, Oxford
Converts to Christianity
English Calvinist and Reformed theologians
17th-century Calvinist and Reformed theologians
Irish Congregationalist ministers